Nicholas Howard Barker (born 1973) is an English extreme metal drummer best known for his work in Cradle of Filth and Dimmu Borgir. Currently he is the drummer for Brujeria and Shining.

Biography
Barker was born on 25 April 1973. He joined Cradle of Filth as their original drummer, playing on the first four albums. After leaving in 1999, he joined Norwegian symphonic black metal band Dimmu Borgir. After being removed from the line-up, Barker went on to play with Brujeria, Old Man's Child, Lock Up, Gaahl and King ov Hell, Ancient, Atrocity, Leaves' Eyes. In 2007 he recorded with Winter's Thrall, on their EP In:Through:Out.

On Dimmu Borgir's 2002 World Misanthropy video, Barker mentioned the following names as influences on his playing style: Neil Peart (Rush), Gene Hoglan (Dark Angel, Death, Strapping Young Lad), Clive Burr, Nicko McBrain (Iron Maiden), Dave Lombardo (Slayer), and Pete Sandoval (Morbid Angel).

In 2011, Barker joined Los Angeles death metal band Sadistic Intent, replacing longtime drummer Emilio Marquèz.

 Barker was drumming in United Forces, featuring two former members of Stormtroopers of Death, vocalist Billy Milano and bassist Dan Lilker, and guitarist Anton Reisenegger.  Barker also joined Voices, featuring former members of Akercocke, as live drummer for their tour of the United Kingdom with Winterfylleth.

Discography

Brujeria
Brujerizmo (2000, Roadrunner Records)
Pocho Aztlan (2016, Nuclear Blast)

Cradle of Filth
The Principle of Evil Made Flesh (1994, Cacophonous Records)
V Empire or Dark Faerytales in Phallustein (1996, Cacophonous Records)
Dusk... and Her Embrace (1996, Music for Nations)
Cruelty and the Beast (1998, Music for Nations)
From the Cradle to Enslave (1999, Music for Nations) (only on the Funeral in Carpathia re-recording)

Dimmu Borgir
Puritanical Euphoric Misanthropia (2001, Nuclear Blast)
Alive in Torment EP (2002, Nuclear Blast)
World Misanthropy EP (2002, Nuclear Blast)
World Misanthropy DVD (2002, Nuclear Blast)
Death Cult Armageddon (2003, Nuclear Blast)

Lock Up
Pleasures Pave Sewers (1999, Nuclear Blaster)
Hate Breeds Suffering (2002, Nuclear Blast)
Play Fast Or Die (2004, Toy Factory)
Necropolis Transparent (2011)
Demonization (2017)

Monolith
Sleep with the Dead 7" (1992, Cacophonous Records)
Tales of the Macabre (1993, Vinyl Solution)

Old Man's Child
In Defiance of Existence (2003, Century Media Records)

Winter's Thrall
In:Through:Out EP (2007, self-released)

Noctis Imperium
Glorification of Evil: The Age Of The Golden Dawn LP (2008, Ariah Records)

Liquid Graveyard
By Nature So Perverse LP & CD (2016, Sleaszy Rider Records/Season Of Mist)

Live / session
Borknagar – live drums 1999
Nightrage – live drums 2004
Anaal Nathrakh – live drums 2004
God Seed – live drums 2007 and 2008
Gorgoroth – live drums 2008
Testament – live drums 2007
Symbolic Death Tribute Band – recording of the DVD – live drums on 12 December 2007
Divine Heresy – session drums 2008 'Bleed the Fifth'
Noctis Imperium – session drums 2008 'Glorification of Evil: The Age Of The Golden Dawn'
Exodus 
The More I See
Anathema – Bloodstock Open Air UK Festival 2009
Ancient
Criminal – live drums in Santiago (2010)
Evile – Live drums in London (12/8/2009)
 River Freshney – Live drums in London (22 July 2010)
 Leaves' Eyes - Live Drums 2009
 Nuclear Assault - Maryland Deathfest XIV (28 May 2016) 
Voices - live drums 2016
Obskkvlt (Galician band) session drums in 2017 for the 2019 album "Blackarhats".

References

External links

1973 births
Living people
Black metal musicians
Cradle of Filth members
Death metal musicians
Dimmu Borgir members
English heavy metal drummers
People from Chesterfield, Derbyshire
Lock Up (British band) members
Testament (band) members
Leaves' Eyes members
21st-century drummers
God Seed members
Old Man's Child members